Frank Daniel Gerber (July 12, 1873 - October 7, 1952) was an American manufacturer of baby food.

Early life
Gerber was born in the town of Douglas in Allegan County, Michigan, in 1873. He graduated from Fremont High School of Western Michigan in 1887. He attended Valparaiso Normal School in Valparaiso, Indiana, for one year, to learn to become a teacher.

Gerber’s father owned a tannery and Gerber joined his father’s firm when he was sixteen. Gerber became a partner of the firm within five years and managed it until it closed in 1905.

Career
Gerber founded Fremont Canning Company in 1901 with his father to market local produce for the farmers. They canned the farmers' peas, beans, and fruits. This company was the basis of the baby food industry.

Gerber became president of Fremont Canning Company in 1917 when his father died.<ref>Ingham, p. 443 When his father died in 1917, he succeeded him as president.</ref> This first year as president of the firm, Gerber had sales that exceeded one million dollars. Gerber expanded the facilities for year-round production in 1914-1915. Before the production was seasonal. Gerber's son Daniel joined the company in 1920. He became assistant general manager of the canning company in 1926.

Gerber had a granddaughter named Sally, born in 1927, who was sickly. Her mother Dorothy, wife of Daniel, would make by hand a diet of strained fruits and vegetables for her as a pediatrician had recommended. After getting tired of this she suggested to her husband that if his company could make tomato puree perhaps they could make strained peas.

Daniel then suggested to his father that they should look into making baby food. Gerber experimented with test batches of strained baby food on baby Sally and other babies in the summer of 1927. Gerber also researched marketing possibilities.

Gerber began selling baby food through the canning company in 1928, using the "Gerber Baby" as their logo symbol. The baby food was sold at fifteen cents each, much less than similar foods which were purchased through drug stores for forty to sixty cents.

Some twelve years later the baby food line was outselling the adult canned food products. The name was changed to Gerber Products Company in 1941, and in 1943 Gerber stopped making canned foods for adults.

Later life
Gerber died in 1952 and the firm was taken over by his son, Daniel Frank Gerber.

Further reading
 Ingham, John N., Biographical Dictionary of American Business Leaders: A-G, Greenwood Press (1983); 
 Shapiro, Eileen C., Fad Surfing in the Boardroom: Managing in the Age of Instant Answers, Basic Books (1996), 
 Obituary, New York Times'', October 8, 1952

References

1873 births
1952 deaths
People from Fremont, Michigan
People from Allegan County, Michigan
Businesspeople from Michigan